Allomyces moniliformis is a species of fungus from the United States.

External links 

 Mycobank entry

References

Blastocladiomycota
Fungi described in 1926
Fungi of the United States
Fungi without expected TNC conservation status